The 1954–55 Soviet Championship League season was the ninth season of the Soviet Championship League, the top level of ice hockey in the Soviet Union. Ten teams participated in the league, and CSK MO Moscow won the championship.

Standings

External links
Season on hockeystars.ru

Soviet League seasons
1954–55 in Soviet ice hockey
Soviet